Arjun Chatterjee (born 14 October 1993) is an Indian professional footballer who plays as a winger for United in the I-League.

Career

Early career
Chatterjee began playing football at the age of 13 before starting his career at a 5th division Kolkata club. He then spent two years each at Kalighat MS and Janbazar before signing for Prayag United in 2011. Then, after a match against Mohun Bagan in the Calcutta Football League, Chatterjee signed for the I-League club in 2012 where he stayed for one season.

United
On 15 February 2014 Chatterjee re-signed for Prayag United, now known as United, for the rest of the season. He made his professional debut for the side on 13 March 2014 against Bengaluru FC at the Kalyani Stadium in which he came on in the 72nd minute for Hasan Al Moustafa as United lost 3–1.

Career statistics

References

External links 
 I-League Profile.

1993 births
Living people

Indian footballers
United SC players
Association football midfielders
Footballers from West Bengal
I-League players
Place of birth missing (living people)